Željko Dimitrov (born 19 February 1994) is a Serbian football forward who plays for Radnik Surdulica.

Club career
Born in Pirot, Dimitrov started playing football with the local club Radnički. He made his first senior appearances in the 2011–12 Serbian League East. During the 2013–14 season, Dimitrov played with Radnik Surdulica in the Serbian First League and Hajduk Beograd in the Serbian League Belgrade. He rejoined Radnički Pirot in 2014. Dimitrov promoted himself as the best team scorer for the 2014–15 season with 22 goals in 32 matches. Dimitrov signed with OFK Beograd in summer 2015. In 2016, he played on loan at Kolubara. Later that year, he moved to Knattspyrnufélag Fjarðabyggðar, where he scored 3 goals in 7 appearances in the 1. deild karla. After the end of the season, Dimitrov returned to Serbia and joined Dinamo Vranje.

In summer 2018, Dimitrov returned to FK Dinamo Vranje for the second time. He left the club again at the end of the season.

Career statistics

References

External links
 Željko Dimitrov stats at utakmica.rs
 

1994 births
Living people
People from Pirot
Association football forwards
Serbian footballers
Serbian expatriate footballers
Serbian expatriate sportspeople in Iceland
Expatriate footballers in Iceland
1. deild karla players
FK Radnički Pirot players
FK Radnik Surdulica players
FK Hajduk Beograd players
OFK Beograd players
FK Kolubara players
FK Dinamo Vranje players
Serbian First League players
Serbian SuperLiga players